Ỹaroamë, or Jawari (Jauari), is a language spoken by the Yanomami people in southern Roraima state, Brazil. It was only recently recognized as a distinct language.

Its name Jawari (Yawari, Joari, Yoari, etc.) is shared with the Ninam language.

Dialects
There are two dialects spoken in Roraima, Brazil:

Opiki (Highland/Serra): in the Serra do Pacu (Catrimani Mission)
Yawaripë (Lowland/Baixada): in Ajarani and Apiaú

Phonology 
The inventory per Ferreira (2011):

/x/ > [ʃ]/_i
/ə/ > [ɨ]/N_

References

Yanomaman languages
Subject–object–verb languages